Michael Enright (born 1964) is a British actor who has played supporting characters in Pirates of the Caribbean: Dead Man's Chest and Old Dogs, as well as in several TV series including Agents of S.H.I.E.L.D., Law & Order: LA, CSI: Crime Scene Investigation, Cold Case, Criminal Minds: Suspect Behavior, and Castle. In 2015, Enright joined the Kurdish People's Protection Units as a volunteer to fight ISIL. As of October 2019, he is in exile in Belize.

Acting career
Enright moved to Los Angeles at the age of nineteen to pursue acting and in the 2000s, he was cast in films such as Pirates of the Caribbean: Dead Man's Chest and Old Dogs, as well as several TV series, including Agents of S.H.I.E.L.D., Law & Order: LA, CSI: Crime Scene Investigation, Cold Case, Criminal Minds: Suspect Behavior, and Castle.

Kurdish YPG and aftermath
Enright joined the Kurdish YPG to fight against ISIS in January 2015, after watching the execution of Jordanian pilot Muath al-Kasasbeh. He contacted the Kurdish People's Protection Units through a British SAS friend and was told to fly to the Iraqi Kurdish city of Sulaymaniyah via Istanbul. According to Enright, he passed physical training in the People's Protection Units and learned to assemble and dismantle a Kalashnikov rifle blindfolded in order to be able to use it at night. Enright was given an AK-47, and fought ISIS on the front line.

After completing a six-month tour of duty with the YPG, Enright attempted to return to the United States. He tried to legally reenter through the US-Mexican San Ysidro border crossing, south of San Diego, but his passport was flagged due to him overstaying his visa. According to Enright, he was deported with an offer to come home if he could help get information on ISIS, so he went back with the YPG for an extended eighteen-month tour of duty. After helping to liberate Raqqa (ISIS capital), he left Syria and went to the American embassy in Belize to try and go back home to the United States.

Heval
On 23 September 2021, American entertainment company Curiosity Stream released the documentary film Heval, its first-ever feature-length production. The film, produced by Jupiter Entertainment, explores the life of Michael Enright and his time serving with the YPG.

Filmography

Film

Television

See also
 List of armed groups in the Syrian Civil War
 Foreign volunteers in the People's Protection Units

References

External links
 

1964 births
21st-century British male actors
British male film actors
British male television actors
Living people
People of the Syrian civil war
People's Protection Units